Scolopax brachycarpa, is an extinct species of woodcock in the family Scolopacidae that was endemic to the Caribbean island of Hispaniola.

Taxonomy
It belonged to an insular radiation of woodcocks that may have once existed throughout the Greater Antilles; another extinct member of this radiation is Scolopax anthonyi from Puerto Rico. Both birds shared more osteological characteristics with the Eurasian woodcock (S. rusticola) than the American woodcock (S. minor).

History and extinction date
It was described from Trouing Jean Paul, a late Holocene limestone cave in Haiti, and was the fourth most common species in the fossil assemblage collected from it. The fossils collected date to between 650 and 1600 years ago, which is over 5 millennia after the first Paleo-Indian presence on Hispaniola. Thus, S. brachycarpa may have survived the Amerindian colonization of Hispaniola and possibly even into the European colonization of the island, as scientific knowledge of the island's avifauna did not rigorously start until the 19th century, at which point S. brachycarpa may have been already wiped out by invasive species, such as cats, dogs, and mongooses.

References

Scolopax
Holocene extinctions
Extinct birds of the Caribbean
Late Quaternary prehistoric birds
Birds of Hispaniola
Endemic birds of Hispaniola
Birds of the Dominican Republic
Birds of Haiti
Extinct animals of the Dominican Republic
Extinct animals of Haiti
Birds described in 2015
Fossil taxa described in 2015
Taxa named by David Steadman